The 1985–86 Atlantic Coast Hockey League season was the fifth season of the Atlantic Coast Hockey League, a North American minor professional league. Five teams participated in the regular season. The new expansion franchise, the New York Slapshots, ran into construction problems on their new arena and with no place to play they became a travel team, playing all of their games on the road until late in the season when they found a temporary home ice in Virginia. The Carolina Thunderbirds were the league champions.

Regular season

Playoffs

External links
 Season 1985/86 on hockeydb.com

Atlantic Coast Hockey League seasons
ACHL